London Township may refer to the following places:

In Canada:
 London Township, Ontario, a former township in Middlesex County amalgamated with other townships to form Middlesex Centre

In the United States:
 London Township, Sumner County, Kansas
 London Township, Monroe County, Michigan
 London Township, Freeborn County, Minnesota

See also 
 London (disambiguation)
 New London Township (disambiguation)

Township name disambiguation pages